Tina Weaver is a British journalist and former National Newspaper editor.

Weaver started her career at the South West News Service, then worked for the Sunday People from 1989 to 1992 becoming Chief Reporter before spending a year at the Daily Mirror. She then joined Today. In 1994, she was named Reporter of the Year for exposing Michael Jackson's relationship with young boys. When Today closed, Weaver moved to the Daily Mirror as Head of Features under Piers Morgan. She became Deputy Editor in 1998. In 1999 she launched and edited the Mirror''''s magazine, M.

M won Newspaper Supplement of the Year within months of launch for its 'innovative & highly targeted style'.

In 2001, Weaver became Editor of the Sunday Mirror, and in 2005 was Chair of Women In Journalism. In 2008 she was appointed to the board of the Press Complaints Commission. On 30 May 2012 publisher Trinity Mirror announced that Tina Weaver had been made redundant and would leave the company "with immediate effect". after the company merged the Daily and Sunday Mirror.

On 14 March 2013, Weaver, then seven months pregnant with her second child, and three other former Mirror'' journalists were arrested by detectives from Scotland Yard's Operation Weeting over alleged phone hacking in 2003–2004.
It was part of a widely criticised police investigation into newspaper journalists which cost the taxpayer £41million. Weaver vehemently denied any wrongdoing. After a 3-year police investigation it was announced there was not evidence to bring any charges against her. No other ex-colleagues were charged either.

Weaver married her long-time partner, former Daily Mirror Editor Richard Wallace at Aynhoe Park, Oxon, in June 2016.

Weaver was appointed Chief Executive of the charity Wellbeing Of Women in September 2016 - October 2018.

References

British journalists
English newspaper editors
Living people
Year of birth missing (living people)